The Patángoro, also called the Pantágoro, are a Native American people of Colombia.

Indigenous peoples in Colombia
Circum-Caribbean tribes